Jessica Henderson Daniel is a psychologist and educator, known for her work on mental health in the Black community, racial trauma, and the effects of stress and violence on Black children and adolescents. Daniel was the first African American woman to lead the American Psychological Association (APA), serving her term as President of the organization in 2018.

She was a member of the faculty at Harvard Medical School and served as Director of Training in Psychology at Boston Children's Hospital.

Awards 
Daniel was the first person of color, woman, and psychologist to win Harvard Medical School's A. Clifford Barger Excellence in Mentoring Award (1998). In 2021, she received the American Psychological Association Award for Outstanding Lifetime Contributions.

Other honors include the American Psychological Association of Graduate Students (APAGS) Kenneth and Mamie Clark Award (1999), the University of Illinois Distinguished Alumni Award (2001), the APA Distinguished Contributions to Education and Training Award (2002), the APA Committee on Women in Psychology, Distinguished Leader for Women in Psychology Award (2008), the Elizabeth Hurlock Beckman Trust Award (2012), and the APA Division 45 Asunción Miteria Austria and John Robinson Distinguished Mentoring Award (2014).

The Society for the Psychology of Women (APA Division 35) gives the Strickland-Daniel Mentoring Award annually to a distinguished feminist mentor, in honor of the distinguished mentoring of Bonnie Ruth Strickland and Jessica Henderson Daniel.

Biography 
Daniel was born in San Antonio, TX. As the daughter of an Air Force crew chief and an NAACP chapter founder, her family moved frequently, which gave her the chance to learn about various cultures.

Daniel studied at Fayetteville State College (now Fayetteville State University) where she received a B.A. in History, summa cum laude graduation in 1964. She attended University of Illinois Urbana-Champaign and completed a master's degree in 1967 and a PhD in 1969 in Education, under the supervision of Ray H. Simpson.  Her dissertation research was conducted in the context of the desegregation and the Black power movements, and examined factors associated with Black graduate students' decisions to obtain employment in what was then viewed as Black versus White work settings. Daniel joined the faculty of Harvard Medical School in 1970 as a mentor to students of color, and remained there throughout her career.

Representative publications 
 
 Daniel, J. H. (2000). The courage to hear: African American women's memories of racial trauma. In L. C. Jackson & B. Greene (Eds.), Psychotherapy with African American women: Innovations in psychodynamic perspective and practice. The Guilford Press.

References

External links 

 Jessica Henderson Daniel profile on Psychology's Feminist Voices
 Strickland-Daniel Mentoring Award

American women psychologists
21st-century American psychologists
African-American psychologists
Developmental psychologists
American Psychological Association
Harvard Medical School faculty
Fayetteville State University alumni
University of Illinois Urbana-Champaign alumni
Year of birth missing (living people)
Living people